Heathcott is a surname. Notable people with the surname include:

Bob Heathcott, Canadian ice hockey player
Mike Heathcott (born 1969), American baseball player
Ralph Heathcott, Anglican clergyman
Slade Heathcott (born 1990), American baseball player

See also
Heathcote (disambiguation)